The following radio stations are licensed to broadcast in Zimbabwe and some are available for livestream. Radio stations provide access to information to the   Zimbabwean people most of which reside in rural areas. This was particularly important during the Covid 19 Lockdown since people were restricted from moving

National
Classic 263
Radio Zimbabwe
Power FM
National FM
Star FM
ZiFM Stereo

Regional and Provincial
Skyz Metro FM - Bulawayo 100.3 FM
Khulumani FM - Bulawayo 95.0 FM
95.8 Central Radio - Gweru 95.8 FM
98.4 Midlands - Gweru 98.4 FM
Breeze FM 91.2 - Victoria Falls 91.2 FM
YAFM - Zvishavane 91.8 FM
Capitalk 100.4 FM - Harare 100.4FM
Hevoi FM - Masvingo 100.2 FM
Diamond FM - Mutare 103.8 FM
Nyaminyami FM - Kariba 94.5 FM

Community Radio
Ntepe-Manama CRT - Manama, Gwanda
Lyeja FM - Hwange
Ingqanga FM - Mbembesi
Radio Bukalanga - Plumtree
Bayethe FM -Matobo
Beitbridge-Shashe CRT - Beitbridge
Twasumbuka FM - Binga
Nyangani FM - Nyanga
Avuxeni FM - Chiredzi
Chimanimani CRT - Chimanimani
Vemuganga CRT - Chipinge
Ndau CRT - Mahenye (Garahwa)
Kazambezi FM - Kariba
Madziwa FM - Shamva
Skyzmetro FM - Bulawayo 
Ya FM -  Zvishavane

Licensed Campus Radio
nust.fm - Bulawayo 101.1 FM
LSU Campus Radio - Lupane
MSU Campus Radio - Gweru
GZU Campus Radio - Masvingo
UZ Campus Radio - Harare
Harare Polytechnic - Harare
CUT FM - Chinhoyi

Internet/Webcast only
Heart and Soul Broadcasting
Nehanda Radio
Zim Net Radio
Zim Net Radio Gospel
Praise 105.2 Radio
YP Radio
Radio VOP
Shaya FM
Remnant Tunes
Pamtengo Radio
Radio54 African Panorama
AfroZim Radio
After5Radio
SW Radio Africa
UFO Trap Station
Channel 2 Fm

Awards 
Radio houses are also eligible to awards in Zimbabwe, to appreciate the contributions made. Radio is also regarded as part of the media industry in Zimbabwe and some radio presenters also receive awards. Bulawayo hosts ROIL BYO Awards media awards annually.

See also
Telecommunications in Zimbabwe
Censorship and Entertainment Control Act, 1967
 List of Zimbabwean writers
Zimbabwe Broadcasting Corporation

References

External links
Links to Zimbabwean Newspapers

Zimbabwe